Einar Hareide may refer to:
 Einar Hareide (politician)
 Einar Hareide (designer)